National Highway 925, commonly referred to as NH 925 is a national highway in India. It is a spur road of National Highway 25.  NH-925 runs in the state of Rajasthan in India.

Route 
NH925 connects Gagaria, Baori kalan, Serwa and Bakhasar in the state of Rajasthan.

Bairadvalley village

See also 
 List of National Highways in India
 List of National Highways in India by state

References

External links 

 NH 925 on OpenStreetMap

National highways in India
National Highways in Rajasthan

भारतमाला नेशनल बॉर्डर हाईवे - 925 के पश्चिम में 20 किलोमिटर दूर भारत-पाक बॉर्डर पर स्थित है बैरड़वैली गांव 
बैरड़वैली को बाड़मेर का कश्मीर कहा जाता हैं